The Men's 4×100 Freestyle Relay at the 10th FINA World Swimming Championships (25m) was swum on 15 December 2010 in Dubai, United Arab Emirates. 17 nations swam in the Preliminary heats in the morning, with the top-8 finishers advancing to the final that evening.

At the start of the event, the existing World (WR) and Championship records (CR) were:

The following records were established during the competition:

Results

Heats

Final

References

Freestyle relay 4x100 metre, Men's
World Short Course Swimming Championships